Hafsatu Kamara (born 7 December 1991) is a Sierra Leonean sprinter. She competed in the 100 metres at the 2015 World Championships in Beijing without advancing from the first round.

She was born in the United States to Sierra Leonean parents and lived in Sierra Leone for some time during her childhood. Never having competed for the United States, she decided to represent her parents' country of origin when approached by that country's officials.

She competed for Sierra Leone at the 2016 Summer Olympics. She finished 8th in her heat for the 100 m and did not qualify for the semifinals. She was the flag bearer for Sierra Leone during the closing ceremony.

International competitions

Personal bests
Outdoor
100 metres – 11.61 (+0.2 m/s, Northridge 2013), (+1.8 m/s, Phoenix 2016)
200 metres – 23.83 (+1.1 m/s, Northridge 2013)
400 metres – 57.85 (Pasadena 2013)
Indoor
60 metres – 7.53 (Flagstaff 2017)
200 metres – 25.39 (New York 2014)

References

External links
 
All-Athletics profile 

1991 births
Living people
Sierra Leonean female sprinters
World Athletics Championships athletes for Sierra Leone
Place of birth missing (living people)
Track and field athletes from Virginia
Athletes (track and field) at the 2014 Commonwealth Games
Athletes (track and field) at the 2018 Commonwealth Games
Commonwealth Games competitors for Sierra Leone
American people of Sierra Leonean descent
Athletes (track and field) at the 2016 Summer Olympics
Olympic athletes of Sierra Leone
Olympic female sprinters
Athletes (track and field) at the 2022 Commonwealth Games